SMERA, widely known as ‘The SME Rating Agency’, is a credit rating agency in India that provides credit ratings primarily of small and medium-sized enterprises. 

Initially an initiative of the Ministry of Finance, Govt. of India and the Reserve Bank of India, SMERA is now a subsidiary of Acuité Ratings & Research Limited. Acuité, a joint initiative of Small Industries Development Bank of India (SIDBI), Dun & Bradstreet Information Services India Private Limited (D&B), Standard Chartered, ICICI and leading public sector banks in India, is registered with SEBI as a credit rating agency.

References

External links
 
 Indian Bank inks MoU with SME Rating Agency of India
 SME rating agency to open four more offices in North
 FM to unveil rating agency for SME today

Financial services companies based in Mumbai
Credit rating agencies in India
Financial services companies established in 2005
Organizations related to small and medium-sized enterprises
Indian companies established in 2005
2005 establishments in Maharashtra